Valarthumrugangal is a 1981 Indian Malayalam-language film, directed by Hariharan. The film stars Ratheesh, Sukumaran, Madhavi and Thikkurissy Sukumaran Nair. The film has musical score by MB Sreenivasan.

Cast 

Ratheesh as Chandran
Sukumaran as Dair Devil Bhaskaran
Madhavi as Janu
Thikkurissy Sukumaran Nair
V. T. Aravindakshamenon
Vijayavani
Balan K. Nair as Kumaran Gurukkal
Chithra
G. K. Pillai
K. P. Ummer
Nagesh
Nanditha Bose
Oduvil Unnikrishnan as Govindan
P. K. Abraham
Prathima
Santo Krishnan

Soundtrack 
The music was composed by M. B. Sreenivasan and the lyrics were written by M. T. Vasudevan Nair.

References

External links 
 

1981 films
1980s Malayalam-language films
Films directed by Hariharan
Films scored by M. B. Sreenivasan